Chignautla (municipality) is a town and municipality of the state of Puebla, in eastern Central Mexico.

References

Municipalities of Puebla